Anthony Coombs (born October 26, 1992) is a professional Canadian football wide receiver who is a free agent. He most recently played for the Ottawa Redblacks of the Canadian Football League (CFL).  He played Canadian Interuniversity Sport (CIS) football with the Manitoba Bisons.

Professional career

Toronto Argonauts 
In the CFL's Amateur Scouting Bureau final rankings, Coombs was ranked eighth best of the players eligible in the 2014 CFL Draft. He was then drafted third overall by the Toronto Argonauts and signed with the team on May 27, 2014.

In his first three seasons, Coombs was mostly used as a backup or rotational player behind starting tailback Curtis Steele and later Brandon Whitaker. 

In Coombs' fourth season in the league, and first under new head coach Marc Trestman, his role in the offense expanded greatly; averaging 5.2 receptions per game. On August 22, mid-way through the season, it was announced that Coombs would have to undergo shoulder surgery. At the time, Trestman said he was hopeful Coombs could return to action before the end of the season. Indeed he did, as he played in the last game of the regular season on November 4, 2017, recording two catches for 31 yards. In the East Final against the Saskatchewan Roughriders, Coombs had a team-leading nine receptions for 77 yards and one carry for three yards. He dressed in the 105th Grey Cup game, but did not record any stats as his team went on to win the Grey Cup championship over the Calgary Stampeders.

Coombs began the 2018 Toronto Argonauts season on the one-game injured list before being transferred to the six-game injured list as he recovered from an ankle injury. Coombs played in only two games in 2018 as he struggled to stay healthy. Following the season, he was re-signed by the Argos to a one-year contract. However, he was released during 2019 training camp on June 5, 2019.

Hamilton Tiger-Cats 
On June 19, 2019, Coombs signed a practice roster agreement with the Hamilton Tiger-Cats. He played in 16 regular season games where he rushed 37 times for 158 yards and had 20 receptions 156 yards and two touchdowns.

Ottawa Redblacks 
Upon entering free agency, Coombs signed with the Ottawa Redblacks on February 11, 2020. However, he did not play in 2020 due to the cancellation of the 2020 CFL season and re-signed with the Redblacks on January 26, 2021. In 2021, Coombs played in 11	games where he had 28 receptions for 247 yards. He became a free agent upon the expiry of his contract on February 8, 2022.

References

External links
Ottawa Redblacks bio
CIS Bio

1992 births
Living people
Canadian football running backs
Manitoba Bisons football players
Canadian football people from Winnipeg
Toronto Argonauts players
Hamilton Tiger-Cats players
Ottawa Redblacks players
Players of Canadian football from Manitoba